Henry Laverne (born Henri Allum; 1888 or 1890 – 4 September 1953) was a French stage and film actor; Laverne was also a comedian and humorist for a decade, as well as a singer on occasion. As an actor, he was usually billed Henry-Laverne in his time (later Henri Laverne) and starred in about twenty films and plays; credits include six films and plays from Sacha Guitry, such as The Lame Devil (1948). As a comedian, he was one half of then-famous comic duo Bach and Laverne (1928–1938;  in French); one of their 157 comedy sketches was adapted as the lyrics to Ray Ventura's hit comedy song "" (1935; lit. "All is very well, Madam the Marchioness").

Biography
Henry Laverne was born Henri Allum in 1888 or 1890 at Boulogne-sur-Mer, France.

Selected filmography 
 Casanova (1934)
 Deburau (1951)
 La poison (1951)
 The Lame Devil (1948)
 The Treasure of Cantenac (1950)

References

External links
 

19th-century births
1953 deaths
French male film actors
French male stage actors
French humorists
French comedians
People from Boulogne-sur-Mer
20th-century French male actors
French male writers
20th-century French comedians
20th-century French male writers